Anthony B. Severin is a Saint Lucian politician. He currently serves as the High Commissioner for Saint Lucia. He previously served as the Ambassador and Permanent Representative of Saint Lucia to the United Nations and the Caribbean community.

On September 19, 2022, he attended the funeral of Elizabeth II.

External links
Office of the Prime Minister of Saint Lucia 
Biography available in Cabinet Secretaries of Saint Lucia

References

Living people
Permanent Representatives of Saint Lucia to the United Nations
Year of birth missing (living people)
Place of birth missing (living people)